The following is an alphabetical list of articles related to the U.S. state of Michigan.

0–9 

.mi.us – Internet second-level domain for the state of Michigan
 2020 coronavirus pandemic in Michigan

A 
Adjacent states and province:

Administrative divisions of Michigan
Agriculture in Michigan
Alger, Smith and Co.
Alpena News
Ambassador Bridge
Amusement parks in Michigan
Ann Arbor Railroad
Aquademics
Aquaria in Michigan
commons:Category:Aquaria in Michigan
Arboreta in Michigan
commons:Category:Arboreta in Michigan
Archaeological sites in Michigan
commons:Category:Archaeological sites in Michigan
Area codes in Michigan
Art museums and galleries in Michigan
commons:Category:Art museums and galleries in Michigan
Astronomical observatories in Michigan
commons:Category:Astronomical observatories in Michigan

B 
Bath School disaster
Binder Park Zoo
Blue Water Bridge
Big Chief Sugar
Botanical gardens in Michigan
commons:Category:Botanical gardens in Michigan
Buildings and structures in Michigan
commons:Category:Buildings and structures in Michigan

C 

Cabinet counties
Capital of the State of Michigan
Capitol of the State of Michigan
commons:Category:Michigan State Capitol
Casinos in Michigan
Cass Lake (Michigan)
Central Michigan

Chicago and West Michigan Railway
Christmas, Michigan
Chrysler Corporation
Cincinnati, Saginaw and Mackinaw Railroad
Climate of Michigan
Climate change in Michigan 
Clinton-Kalamazoo Canal
Communications in Michigan
commons:Category:Communications in Michigan
 Constitution of Michigan
Convention centers in Michigan
commons:Category:Convention centers in Michigan
Copper Country
Copper mining in Michigan
Counties of the state of Michigan
commons:Category:Counties in Michigan
:Category:Michigan culture
commons:Category:Michigan culture

D 
Demographics of Michigan
Detroit, Michigan, territorial capital 1805-1812 and 1813–1837, state capital 1837-1847
Detroit and Mackinac Railway
Detroit Free Press
Detroit Ignition
Detroit Lions
Detroit Pistons
Detroit Red Wings
Detroit River
Detroit Shock
Detroit Sunday Journal
Detroit Tigers
Detroit Zoo
DeYoung Family Zoo
Dow Chemical Company
Dow Corning

E 
Eastern white pine
Economy of Michigan
:Category:Economy of Michigan
commons:Category:Economy of Michigan
Education in Michigan
:Category:Education in Michigan
commons:Category:Education in Michigan
Elections in the state of Michigan
:Category:Michigan elections
commons:Category:Michigan elections
Emerald ash borer
Environment of Michigan
commons:Category:Environment of Michigan

F 

List of festivals in Michigan
commons:Category:Festivals in Michigan
Flag of the State of Michigan
Flint/Tri-Cities
List of Michigan flowers
Ford Motor Company
Forts in Michigan
:Category:Forts in Michigan
commons:Category:Forts in Michigan
Marshall Fredericks
Frederick Carl Frieseke

G 

Garlyn Zoo
General Motors Corporation
Geography of Michigan
:Category:Geography of Michigan
commons:Category:Geography of Michigan
Geology of Michigan
commons:Category:Geology of Michigan
Gerald Ford
Ghost towns in Michigan
:Category:Ghost towns in Michigan
commons:Category:Ghost towns in Michigan
Golf clubs and courses in Michigan
Government of the state of Michigan  website
:Category:Government of Michigan
commons:Category:Government of Michigan
Governor of the State of Michigan
List of governors of Michigan
Grand River Avenue
Great Lakes
Great Lakes Central Railroad
Great Lakes region
Great Lakes Waterway
Great Seal of the State of Michigan

H 
Hartwick Pines State Park
Heritage railroads in Michigan
commons:Category:Heritage railroads in Michigan
Hiawatha National Forest
Highway system of Michigan
Hiking trails in Michigan
commons:Category:Hiking trails in Michigan
History of Michigan
Historical outline of Michigan
:Category:History of Michigan
commons:Category:History of Michigan
Huron National Forest
Huron-Manistee National Forests
Houghton, Michigan

I
Images of Michigan
commons:Category:Michigan
:Category:Images of Metro Detroit
Interlochen State Park
Islands of Michigan
Isle Royale National Park

J
John Ball Park

K
Kmart
Keweenaw Peninsula
Keweenaw Waterway

L 

Lakes in Michigan
Lake Erie
Lake Huron
Lake Michigan
Lake Saint Clair
Lake Superior
:Category:Lakes of Michigan
commons:Category:Lakes of Michigan
Landmarks in Michigan
commons:Category:Landmarks in Michigan
Lansing, Michigan, state capital since 1847
Lansing Lugnuts
Law schools in Michigan
Lighthouses of Michigan
Lighthouses in the United States
Lists related to the state of Michigan:
List of airports in Michigan
List of automobile manufacturers of Michigan
List of ballot measures in Michigan
List of butterflies in Michigan
List of cities, villages, and townships in Michigan
List of Civil War regiments from Michigan
List of colleges and universities in Michigan
List of companies based in Michigan
List of counties of Michigan
List of county-designated highways in Michigan
List of covered bridges in Michigan
List of dams and reservoirs in Michigan
List of ghost towns in Michigan
List of governors of Michigan
List of governors of Michigan Territory
List of high schools in Michigan
List of individuals executed in Michigan
List of Interstate Highways in Michigan
List of islands of Michigan
List of lakes in Michigan
List of law enforcement agencies in Michigan
List of lighthouses in Michigan
List of mayors of Detroit, Michigan
List of mayors of Grand Rapids, Michigan
List of mayors of Lansing, Michigan
List of mayors of Saginaw, Michigan
List of mines in Michigan
List of municipalities in Michigan (by population)
List of museums in Michigan
List of National Historic Landmarks in Michigan
List of newspapers in Michigan
List of Olympic medalists from Michigan
List of people from Michigan
List of people from Saginaw, Michigan
List of power stations in Michigan
List of protected areas in Michigan
List of Pure Michigan Byways
List of radio stations in Michigan
List of railroads in Michigan
List of Registered Historic Places in Michigan
List of rivers in Michigan
List of school districts in Michigan
List of shopping malls in Michigan
List of sister cities in Michigan
List of state forests in Michigan
List of state parks in Michigan
List of state prisons in Michigan
List of symbols of the State of Michigan
List of state trunklines in Michigan
List of tallest buildings in Michigan
List of telephone area codes in Michigan
List of television stations in Michigan
List of threatened fauna of Michigan
List of townships in Michigan
List of United States congressional delegations from Michigan
List of United States congressional districts in Michigan
List of United States representatives from Michigan
List of United States senators from Michigan
List of U.S. Highways in Michigan
List of weather records of Michigan
Lower Peninsula of Michigan
Lumberman's Monument

M 
Mackinac Bridge
Manistee National Forest
Maps of Michigan
commons:Category:Maps of Michigan
Jacques Marquette
Marquette, Michigan
Merit Network
Metro Detroit
MI – United States Postal Service postal code for the State of Michigan
MiCorps
Mid-Michigan
Midwest
Michiana
Michigan
:Category:Michigan
commons:Category:Michigan
commons:Category:Maps of Michigan
Michigan AuSable Valley Railroad
Michigan Basin
Michigan Court of Appeals
Michigan Democratic Party
Michigander
Michigan Intercollegiate Athletic Association
Michigan Islands Wilderness Area
Michigan Islands National Wildlife Refuge
Michigan left
Michigan maps
Michigan Mountain Biking Association
Michigan Public Transit Association
Michigan Religious Freedom Restoration Act
Michigan Republican Party
Michigan Schools and Government Credit Union
Michigan State Capitol
Michigan State Police
Michigan State University
Michigan Sugar Company
Michigan Supreme Court
Michigan Technological University
Michigan Territory
Michigan wine
The Mining Journal
Monuments and memorials in Michigan
commons:Category:Monuments and memorials in Michigan
Mountains of Michigan
commons:Category:Mountains of Michigan
Museums in Michigan
:Category:Museums in Michigan
commons:Category:Museums in Michigan
Music of Michigan
commons:Category:Music of Michigan
:Category:Musical groups from Michigan
:Category:Musicians from Michigan

N 
National Forests of Michigan
commons:Category:National Forests of Michigan
Natural gas pipelines in Michigan
Natural history of Michigan
commons:Category:Natural history of Michigan
Nature centers in Michigan
commons:Category:Nature centers in Michigan
Nestlé
Newspapers published in Michigan
Non-profit organizations based in Michigan
Nordhouse Dunes Wilderness
Northern Michigan
Northern Michigan Football League
Northland Center (Michigan)
Northville, Michigan
Northwest Territory
Northern Michigan University
Novi, Michigan

O 
Ottawa National Forest
Outdoor sculptures in Michigan
commons:Category:Outdoor sculptures in Michigan

P 
The Palace of Auburn Hills
People from Michigan
:Category:People from Michigan
commons:Category:People from Michigan
:Category:People by city in Michigan
:Category:People by county in Michigan
:Category:People from Michigan by occupation
Pere Marquette Railway
Petoskey stone
Pewabic Pottery
Pictured Rocks National Lakeshore
Pioneer Sugar
Pioneer Surgical Technology
Orlando Poe
Politics of Michigan
commons:Category:Politics of Michigan
Potter Park Zoological Gardens
Protected areas of Michigan
:Category:Protected areas of Michigan
commons:Category:Protected areas of Michigan
Pure Michigan
Pure Michigan Byway

R 
Railroad museums in Michigan
commons:Category:Railroad museums in Michigan
Regions of Michigan
Religion in Michigan
:Category:Religion in Michigan
commons:Category:Religion in Michigan
Repopulation of wolves in Midwestern United States

S 
St. Clair River
St. Mary's River
Henry Schoolcraft
Saginaw Trail
Scouting in Michigan
Seamanite
Settlements in Michigan
Cities in Michigan
Villages in Michigan
Townships in Michigan
Census Designated Places in Michigan
Other unincorporated communities in Michigan
List of ghost towns in Michigan
Ski areas and resorts in Michigan
commons:Category:Ski areas and resorts in Michigan
Sleeping Bear Dunes National Lakeshore
Solar power in Michigan
Southern Michigan
Southwest Michigan Devil Rays
Sports in Michigan
commons:Category:Sports in Michigan
Sports venues in Michigan
commons:Category:Sports venues in Michigan
State of Michigan  website
Government of the State of Michigan
:Category:Government of Michigan
commons:Category:Government of Michigan
Stratton, Mary Chase Perry
Structures in Michigan
commons:Category:Buildings and structures in Michigan
Symbols of the State of Michigan
Michigan state bird: American robin (Turdus migratorius)
Michigan state coat-of-arms: Coat-of-Arms of the State of Michigan
Michigan state fish: brook trout (Salvelinus fontinalis)
Michigan state flag: Flag of the State of Michigan
Michigan state flower: apple blossom (Malus domestica)
Michigan state fossil: mastodon (Mammut americanum)
Michigan state game animal: white-tailed deer (Odocoileus virginianus)
Michigan state gem: Isle Royale greenstone (chlorastrolite)
Michigan state mammal: wolverine (Gulo gulo luscus) (unofficial)
Michigan state motto:  Si quaeris peninsulam amoenam circumspice (Latin for "If you seek a pleasant peninsula, look about you") (unofficial)
Michigan state nicknames:  Wolverine State and Great Lakes State (unofficial)
Michigan state reptile: western painted turtle (Chrysemys picta bellii)
Michigan state seal: Great Seal of the State of Michigan
Michigan state soil: Kalkaska sand
Michigan state song:  "My Michigan" website
Michigan state stone: Petoskey stone
Michigan state tree: eastern white pine (Pinus strobus)
Michigan state wildflower: dwarf lake iris (Iris lacustris)
United States quarter dollar - Michigan 2004

T 
Telecommunications in Michigan
commons:Category:Communications in Michigan
Telephone area codes in Michigan
Television stations
The Thumb
Theatres in Michigan
commons:Category:Theatres in Michigan
Tiger Stadium
Toledo Strip
Toledo War
Tourism in Michigan  website
commons:Category:Tourism in Michigan
Transportation in Michigan
:Category:Transportation in Michigan
commons:Category:Transport in Michigan
Traverse City Record-Eagle

U 
United States of America
States of the United States of America
United States census statistical areas of Michigan
United States congressional delegations from Michigan
United States congressional districts in Michigan
United States Court of Appeals for the Sixth Circuit
United States District Court for the Eastern District of Michigan
United States District Court for the Western District of Michigan
United States representatives from Michigan
United States senators from Michigan
University of Michigan
Upper Midwest
Upper Peninsula of Michigan
US-MI – ISO 3166-2:US region code for the State of Michigan

W 
Water in Michigan
Water parks in Michigan
Waterfalls of Michigan
commons:Category:Waterfalls of Michigan
West Michigan Whitecaps
Western Michigan
Wikimedia
Wikimedia Commons:Category:Michigan
commons:Category:Maps of Michigan
Wikinews:Category:Michigan
Wikinews:Portal:Michigan
Wikipedia Category:Michigan
Wikipedia Portal:Michigan
Wikipedia:WikiProject Michigan
:Category:WikiProject Michigan articles
Wikipedia:WikiProject Michigan/Members
Wind power in Michigan
Wisconsin v. Michigan

X

Y 
Yooper

Z 
Zoos in Michigan
commons:Category:Zoos in Michigan

See also

Topic overview:
Michigan
Outline of Michigan

 1
 
Michigan